Maurizio Savini is an Italian sculptor known for making art out of chewing gum.

Maurizio Savini was born in Roma. He has been commissioned as stage designer by Maggio Musicale Fiorentino and Salzburg Easter Festival, and held several dozen exhibitions. He was awarded a Cité internationale des arts scholarship by the city of Paris in 2005.

References

External links
 Some of his sculptures

Living people
Year of birth missing (living people)
21st-century Italian sculptors
Italian male sculptors
21st-century Italian male artists